Saturnin is a 1942 humorous novel by Zdeněk Jirotka, with characters such as the dangerous servant Saturnin, the annoying Aunt Kateřina and her son Milouš, Uncle František, Doctor Vlach, and the narrator's grandfather.

The book is probably the best work of Zdeněk Jirotka. This novel is strongly inspired by work of English authors, esp. Jerome K. Jerome and by novels and short stories by English writer P. G. Wodehouse which features the character of the servant Jeeves. It has been translated into English, French, German, Spanish, Italian, Ukrainian, Serbo-Croatian, Estonian, Latvian, Turkish and Polish. Foreign-language versions are issued by Charles University's publisher Karolinum.

Film, television, and theatrical adaptations
The basic storyline of this novel has been filmed as Saturnin, which was then split into a 4-part series and broadcast on Czech television. The servant Saturnin was played by Oldřich Vízner.

In 2017, Miroslav Macek wrote a sequel to Saturnin, called Saturnin se vrací (Saturnin Returns).

Characters
 Saturnin - a servant with a bold sense of humor
 Narrator - in the book without name, in the film the Narrator is called Jiří Oulický
 Aunt Kateřina - she is a negative figure in novel, she uses proverbs too often
 Grandpa - an old rich man
 Miss Barbora Terebová - a sweet modern woman
 Doctor Vlach - a man with a rather harsh sense of humor
 Milouš - a boorish wastrel
 Uncle František - he is already dead at the time of the storyline

Analysis
Sehnalová, Kamila. 2013. Comparative Analysis of Czech, English and German Proverbs in Jirotka's Saturnin. BA thesis, Charles University, Prague. Link to thesis

References

External links in Czech
 Gallery and basics about the movie
 Quotes and records from the movie

1942 novels
Czech novels adapted into films